Dr. Derwin L. Gray (born April 9, 1971) is a former NFL football player and the founding and lead pastor of Transformation Church in Indian Land, South Carolina.

College and NFL
After graduating from Brigham Young University, Derwin was the 92nd pick in the 1993 NFL Draft. He played for five years with the Indianapolis Colts (1993-1997) and one year with the Carolina Panthers (1998).

Church work
Derwin and his wife Vicki began an itinerant speaking ministry, One Heart At A Time Ministries, in 1999. Derwin went on to graduate magna cum laude from Southern Evangelical Seminary with a Master of Divinity (M.Div.) degree, with a focus in apologetics. Derwin and Vicki founded Transformation Church in January 2010. In 2018, Derwin received his Doctor of Ministry in the New Testament in Context at Northern Seminary under Dr. Scot McKnight.

Along with pastoring Transformation Church, Derwin speaks at conferences across the country and is referred to as the “Evangelism Linebacker." He has written 6 books: Hero: Unleashing God’s Power in a Man’s Heart, published 2010; Limitless Life: You Are More Than Your Past When God Holds Your Future, published 2013; Crazy Grace for Crazy Times Bible Study, published 2015; The High Definition Leader: Building Multiethnic Churches in a Multiethnic World, published 2015; The Good Life: What Jesus Teaches About Happiness, published 2020, and How to Heal Our Racial Divide: What the Bible Says, and the First Christians Knew, about Racial Reconciliation in 2022.

Personal life
Derwin married Vicki Ensign in 1992, whom he met his freshman year at BYU. They have two children: a daughter, Presley, and a son, Jeremiah.

NFL stats

References

External links
 Football Database

1971 births
Living people
American Protestants
Players of American football from San Antonio
American football defensive backs
Judson High School alumni
Southern Evangelical Seminary alumni
BYU Cougars football players
Indianapolis Colts players
Carolina Panthers players